Vyacheslav Ivanovich Ivanov (– 16 July 1949) was a Russian poet and playwright associated with the Russian Symbolist movement. He was also a philosopher, translator, and literary critic.

Early life
Born in Moscow, Ivanov graduated from the First Moscow Gymnasium with a gold medal and entered Moscow University where he studied history and philosophy under Sir Paul Vinogradoff. In 1886, he moved to Berlin University to study Roman law and economics under Theodor Mommsen. During his stay in Germany, he absorbed the thought of Friedrich Nietzsche and German Romantics, notably Novalis and Friedrich Hölderlin.

In 1886 Ivanov married Darya Mikhailovna Dmitrievskaya, the sister of his close childhood friend Aleksei Dmitrievsky. From 1892 he studied archaeology in Rome, completing his doctoral dissertation there. In 1893 he met Lydia Zinovieva-Annibal, a poet and translator. Having both received an Orthodox ecclesiastical divorce, they married in 1899, first settling in Athens, then moving to Geneva, and making pilgrimages to Egypt and Palestine. During that period, Ivanov frequently visited Italy, where he studied Renaissance art. The rugged nature of Lombardy and the Alps became the subject of his first sonnets, which were heavily influenced by the medieval poetry of Catholic mystics.

Poet and classicist
At the turn of the 20th century, Ivanov elaborated his views on the spiritual mission of Rome and the Ancient Greek cult of Dionysus. He summed up his Dionysian ideas in the treatise The Hellenic Religion of the Suffering God (1904), which traces the roots of literature in general and, following Nietzsche's The Birth of Tragedy, the art of tragedy in particular to ancient Dionysian mysteries.

Ivanov's first collection, Lodestars, was published in 1903. It contained many of his pieces written a decade earlier and was praised by the leading critics as a new chapter in  Russian Symbolism. The poems were compared to Milton's and Trediakovsky's on account of their detached, calculated archaism.

In 1905, Ivanov made his triumphant return to St Petersburg, where he was much lionized as a foreign curiosity. A turreted house where he and Zinovieva-Annibal settled became the most fashionable literary salon of the era, and was frequented by poets (Alexander Blok), philosophers (Nikolai Berdyayev), artists (Konstantin Somov), and dramatists (Vsevolod Meyerhold). The latter staged Calderon's Adoration of the Cross in Ivanov's house. The poet exerted a formative influence on the Russian Symbolist movement, whose main tenets were formulated in the turreted house.

According to James H. Billington: 
'Viacheslav the Magnificent' was the crown prince and chef de salon of the new society, which met in his seventh floor apartment 'The Tower,' overlooking the gardens of the Tauride Palace in St. Peterburg. Walls and partitions were torn down to accommodate the increasing numbers of talented and disputatious people who flocked to the Wednesday soirees, which were rarely in full swing until after supper had been served at 2 A.M.

Future Russian Orthodox nun Maria Skobtsova was then an acclaimed poet and frequent guest at the Ivanov flat. Decades later, while living in Paris as a White emigre, she recalled the atmosphere at the Tower: 
We lived in the middle of a vast country as if on an uninhabited island. Russia was illiterate, whereas in our milieu was concentrated all the culture of the world: the Greeks were quoted by heart, we welcomed the French symbolists, we thought of Scandinavian literature as our own, we were familiar with the philosophy, theology, poetry and history of the whole wide world, in this sense we were citizens of the universe, the keepers of mankind's cultural museum. This was Rome in the time of its decline... We played out the last act of the tragedy concerned with the rift between the intelligentsia and the people. Beyond us stretched out the Russian Empire's snowy desert, a country in fetters: it was as ignorant of our delights as of our anguish, while its own delights and anguish had no effect on us.

Theories of theatre

It was at this time that Ivanov wrote the first of his two plays, Tantalus (1905). Like his second, Prometheus (1919), it imitated the dramatic structure and mythological subject-matter of Aeschylean tragedy and was written in obscure and archaic language. It was his unrealised, utopian ideas about theatre, however, that proved far more influential. Ivanov regarded it as having the potential to be the most powerful of the arts and capable of taking over the function of the Church and restoring religious belief in a society that had lost its faith.

Ivanov's theories were part of a shift in the second phase of Russian Symbolism away from the influence of French decadence and the ideas of Valery Bryusov, with its abstract evocations of inner states, towards the German philosophical tradition, and the ideas of Richard Wagner and Friedrich Nietzsche in particular, and the promotion of an ecstatic (in both the religious and philosophical senses) theatre of mass participation. The ideas of Aleksei Remizov (who was the literary manager of Vsevolod Meyerhold's New Drama Association at this time), Fyodor Sologub, and the Mystical Anarchism of Georgy Chulkov were all part of this second phase of the movement.

Ivanov proposed the creation of a new type of mass theatre, which he called a "collective action," that would be modelled on ancient religious rituals, Athenian tragedy, and the medieval mystery play. Writing in an essay on the mask ("Poèt i Čern") that was published in the magazine Vesy (Libra or The Scales) in 1904, Ivanov argued for a revival of the ancient relationship between the poet and the masses. Inspired by The Birth of Tragedy and Wagner's theories of theatre, Ivanov sought to provide a philosophical foundation for his proposals by linking Nietzsche's analysis with Leo Tolstoy's Christian moralising, and ancient cultic performance with later Christian mysteries. The idea that the Dionysian could be associated with a concept of universal brotherhood would have been completely alien to Nietzsche, who had stressed the fundamental differences between the two traditions. Ivanov, however, understood Dionysus as an avatar for Christ. By means of the mask, he argued, the tragic hero appears not as an individual character but rather as the embodiment of a fundamental Dionysian reality, "the one all-human I." By means of hero's example, therefore, staged myth would give the people access to its sense of the "total unity of suffering."

Rejecting theatrical illusion, Ivanov's modern liturgical theatre would offer not the representation of action (mimesis), but action itself (praxis). This would be achieved by overcoming the separation between stage and auditorium, adopting an open space similar to the classical Greek orchêstra, and abolishing the division between actor and audience, such that all become co-creating participants in a sacred rite. Ivanov imagined staging such a performance in a hall in which furniture is distributed "by whim and inspiration."  Actors would mingle with the audience, handing out masks and costumes, before, singing and dancing as a chorus, collective improvisation would merge all participants into a communal unity.

Thus, he hoped, the theatre would facilitate a genuine revolution in culture and society. Writing in Po zvezdam in 1908, Ivanov argued:
The theatres of the chorus tragedies, the comedies and the mysteries must become the breeding-ground for the creative, or prophetic, self-determination of the people; only then will be resolved the problem of fusing actors and spectators in a single orgiastic body. [...] And only, we may add, when the choral voice of such communities becomes a genuine referendum of the true will of the people will political freedom become a reality.

While some, such as the director Meyerhold, enthusiastically embraced Ivanov's ideas (at least insofar as they proposed overcoming the division between actor and audience in a collective improvisation), others were more skeptical. The poet Andrei Bely argued that the realities of a modern, class-divided society could not be abolished by means of masks and costumes, however earnestly adopted:
Let's suppose we go into the temple-theatre, robe ourselves in white clothes, crown ourselves with bunches of roses, perform a mystery play (its theme is always the same—God-like man wrestles with fate) and then at the appropriate moment we join hands and begin to dance. Imagine yourself, reader, if only for just one minute, in this role. We are the ones who will be spinning round the sacrificial altar—all of us: the fashionable lady, the up-and-coming stockbroker, the worker and the member of the State Council. It is too much to expect that our steps and our gestures will coincide. While the class struggle still exists, these appeals for an aesthetic democratization are strange.

Beyond widowhood
His wife's death in 1907 was a great blow to Ivanov. Thereafter the dazzling Byzantine texture of his poetry wore thin, as he insensibly slipped into theosophy and mysticism. The poet even claimed to have had a vision of his late wife ordering him to marry Vera Shvarsalon, her daughter by her first marriage. Indeed, he married 23-year-old Vera in the summer of 1913; their son Dmitry had been born in 1912. Vera's death in 1920, at the age of 30, broke his heart.

Anna Akhmatova
According to an autobiographical sketch written by Anna Akhmatova, Ivanov first met her in 1910. At the time, Akhmatova was still married to Nikolai Gumilev, who first brought her to the turreted house. There, Akhmatova read some of her verse aloud to Ivanov, who ironically quipped, "What truly heavy romanticism." A short time later, Gumilev left his wife for a big game hunting holiday in Ethiopia. In the aftermath, Ivanov tried very hard to persuade Akhmatova to leave her immature husband, saying, "You'll make him a man if you do." Moreover, Akhmatova indignantly recalled that Ivanov would often weep as she recited her verse at the turreted house, but would later, "vehemently criticize," the same poems at literary salons. Akhmatova would never forgive him for this. Her ultimate evaluation of her former patron was as follows, "Vyacheslav was neither grand nor magnificent (he thought this up himself) but a 'catcher of men.'"

Translator and scholar
Upon their return from an Italian voyage (1912–13), Ivanov made the acquaintances of art critic Mikhail Gershenzon, philosopher Sergei Bulgakov, and composer Alexander Scriabin. He elaborated many of his Symbolist theories in a series of articles, which were finally revised and reissued as Simbolismo in 1936. At that time, he relinquished poetry in favour of translating the works of Sappho, Alcaeus, Aeschylus, and Petrarch into the Russian language.

After 1917
In 1920, Ivanov moved to Baku, where he held the University Chair of Classical Philology. He concentrated on his scholarly work and completed a treatise  Dionysus and Early Dionysianism (published 1923), which earned him a Ph.D. degree in philology. The new communist government didn't allow him to travel outside the Soviet Union until 1924.

Emigration

From Azerbaijan he proceeded to Italy, where he settled in Rome. In Rome, Ivanov found employment as professor of Old Church Slavonic at the Russicum. Ivanov became an Eastern Rite Catholic and was formally received into the Russian Greek Catholic Church in 1926. In an interview about his conversion for the Russicum's newspaper, Ivanov argued that, prior to their Great Schism, Latin and Byzantine Christianity were "two principles that mutually complement each other." "The Church must permeate all branches of life: social issues, art, culture, and just everything," he argued, and the "Roman Church corresponds to such criteria and by joining this Church I become truly Orthodox." His last collections of Christian poetry were the Roman Sonnets (1924) and the Roman Diary (1944). Many other poems appeared posthumously.

Ivanov died in Rome in 1949 and was interred at the Cimitero Acattolico, not far from the graves of Karl Briullov and Alexander Ivanov.

References

Sources
 Banham, Martin, ed. 1998. The Cambridge Guide to Theatre. Cambridge: Cambridge UP. .
 Billington, James H. 1966. The Icon and the Axe: An Interpretice History of Russian Culture. New York: Random House. .
 Carlson, Marvin. 1993. Theories of the Theatre: A Historical and Critical Survey from the Greeks to the Present. Expanded ed. Ithaca and London: Cornell University Press. .
 Golub, Spencer. 1998. "Ivanov, Vyacheslav (Ivanovich)." In Banham (1998, 552).
 Hackel, Sergei. 1982. Pearl of Great Price: The Life of Mother Maria Skobtsova, 1891-1945. Crestwood, NY: Saint Vladimir's Seminary P. .
 Kleberg, Lars. 1980. Theatre as Action: Soviet Russian Avant-Garde Aesthetics. Trans. Charles Rougle. New Directions in Theatre. London: Macmillan, 1993. .
 Polivanov, Konstantin. 1994. Anna Akhmatova and Her Circle. Trans. Patricia Beriozkina. Fayetteville: U of Arkansas P. .
 Puskás, Lásló, et al. 2002. Theodore Romzha: His Life, Times, and Martyrdom. Fairfax, VA: Eastern Christian Publications. .
 Rosenthal, Bernice Glatzer. 2004. New Myth, New World: From Nietzsche To Stalinism. University Park, PA: Pennsylvania State UP. .
 Rudnitsky, Konstantin. 1981. Meyerhold the Director. Trans. George Petrov. Ed. Sydney Schultze. Revised translation of Rezhisser Meierkhol'd. Moscow: Academy of Sciences, 1969. .
 ---. 1988. Russian and Soviet Theatre: Tradition and the Avant-Garde. Trans. Roxane Permar. Ed. Lesley Milne. London: Thames and Hudson. . Reprinted as Russian and Soviet Theater, 1905-1932. New York: Abrams.

External links

 V.Ivanov Research Center in Rome
 
 
  An ample selection of English translations of verse and prose poems by Babette Deutsch and Avrahm Yarmolinsky, 1921
  English translations of 2 short poems
 Russian Virtual Library's Collection of Ivanov's Poetry and Prose (in Russian)
The Poems by Vyacheslav Ivanov (English)

1866 births
1949 deaths
Writers from Moscow
People from Moskovsky Uyezd
Converts to Eastern Catholicism from Eastern Orthodoxy
Eastern Catholic poets
Former Russian Orthodox Christians
Russian Eastern Catholics
Russian Greek-Catholics
Russian Catholic poets
Catholic philosophers
Russian dramatists and playwrights
Russian male dramatists and playwrights
Russian male poets
Russian philosophers
Russian classical scholars
Sonneteers
Symbolist dramatists and playwrights
Symbolist poets
Theatre theorists
Translators of Dante Alighieri
20th-century Russian poets
20th-century translators
Emigrants from the Russian Empire to Italy
White Russian emigrants to Italy
Burials in the Protestant Cemetery, Rome